Quietude may refer to:

 Quietude (Lenny Breau album), 1985 album
 Quietude (Eliane Elias album), 2022 album